Sinful Deeds is the second EP of the Finnish progressive metal band Crimson Lotus. It was released on September 5, 2005. Original album artwork created by Lydia C. Burris.

Guest musicians: Matti Auerkallio (vocals on tracks 1, 2 and 5), Susanna Syrjä (vocals on tracks 1, 3 and 4), Landis Lee Bender II (vocals on tracks 3 and 4), Hannu Leppänen (guitar chase solo on track 2), Laura Hagström (piano on track 4).

Track listing
 Velvet Night – 6:54
 Little pieces – 7:34
 Broken – 6:16
 Fall of Eden – 6:44
 Relentless – 3:45

External links 
 

2005 EPs